The Marcellus Pedrick House, also known as the Pedrick-Lawson House, is located in Ripon, Wisconsin, United States. It was added to the National Register of Historic Places in 1976.

The house is owned by the Ripon Historical Society and maintained as a historic house museum.

History
The house was built by Marcellus Pedrick for himself and his wife in the 1850s. Pedrick had moved to Ripon from New York City in 1849. Later, the house was lived in by Hollis Atkins and his family from 1903 to 1918. In 1919, Louisa La Belle moved into the house. She remained there until her death in 1973, at which time she left the house to the Ripon Historical Society in her will.

References

External links
 Ripon Historical Society

Houses in Fond du Lac County, Wisconsin
Houses on the National Register of Historic Places in Wisconsin
Italianate architecture in Wisconsin
Museums in Fond du Lac County, Wisconsin
Historic house museums in Wisconsin
National Register of Historic Places in Fond du Lac County, Wisconsin